Cycas maconochiei is a species of cycad, endemic to Australia's Northern Territory. This species has three subspecies C. maconochiei ssp. maconochiei, C. maconochieissp. lanata and C. maconochiei ssp. viridis.

References

maconochiei
Flora of the Northern Territory